"Re-Arrange" is a song by Scottish alternative rock band Biffy Clyro, and the fourth single from the band's seventh studio album, Ellipsis.

Charts

Certifications

References

External links 
 Music video on YouTube

Biffy Clyro songs
2016 songs
2016 singles
14th Floor Records singles
Songs written by Simon Neil